Julián Marías Aguilera (17 June 1914 – 15 December 2005) was a Spanish philosopher associated with the Generation of '36 movement. He was a pupil of the Spanish philosopher José Ortega y Gasset and member of the Madrid School.<ref>A. Pablo Iannone, Dictionary of World Philosophy', Routledge, 2013, p. 328: "Madrid School".</ref>

 Life and work 
Marías was born in the city of Valladolid, and moved to Madrid at the age of five. He went on to study philosophy at the Complutense University of Madrid, graduating in 1936. Within months of his graduation the Spanish Civil War broke out. During the conflict Marías sided with the Republicans, although his actual contributions were limited to propaganda articles and broadcasts.

Following the end of the war in 1939, Marías returned to education. His doctoral thesis was rejected by the university, however, and handed over to the police, due to his inclusion of a number of lines critical of the rule of Franco. As a consequence of his writings Marías was briefly imprisoned and, upon his release, banned from teaching. Fortunately for Marías the proceeds from the sales of his History of Philosophy, which went through countless editions, meant that the punishment did not seriously damage his livelihood.

In 1948 he co-founded, along with his former teacher José Ortega y Gasset, the Instituto de Humanidades (which he went on to head after the death of Ortega in 1955). Between the late 1940s and the 1970s, being unable to teach in Spain, Marías taught at numerous institutions in the United States, including Harvard University, Yale University, Wellesley College, the University of Oklahoma, and UCLA.

Marías wrote on a wide variety of subjects during his long career. A subject of particular interest was Miguel de Cervantes' Don Quixote. In 1964 he was elected into the Real Academia Española, and he won a Prince of Asturias award in 1996.

He is the father of novelist Javier Marías and art historian Fernando Marías, and married the sister of director Jesús Franco.

 Works Juventud en el mundo antiguo. Crucero universitario por el Mediterráneo, Espasa Calpe, Madrid, 1934Historia de la filosofía, with a prologue by Xavier Zubiri, epilogue by José Ortega y Gasset, Revista de Occidente, Madrid 1941 (28th ed., 1976)La filosofía del Padre Gratry. La restauración de la Metafísica en el problema de Dios y de la persona, Escorial, Madrid 1941Miguel de Unamuno, Espasa Calpe, Madrid, 1943El tema del hombre, Revista de Occidente, Madrid, 1943San Anselmo y el insensato y otros estudios de filosofía, Revista de Occidente, Madrid, 1944Introducción a la filosofía, Revista de Occidente, Madrid, 1947La filosofía española actual. Unamuno, Ortega, Morente, Zubiri, Espasa Calpe, Madrid, 1948El método histórico de las generaciones, Revista de Occidente, Madrid, 1949Ortega y tres antípodas. Un ejemplo de intriga intelectual, Revista de Occidente, Buenos Aires, 1950Biografía de la Filosofía, Emecé, Buenos Aires, 1954Ensayos de teoría, Barna, Barcelona, 1954Idea de la Metafísica, Columba, Buenos Aires, 1954La estructura social. Teoría y método, Sociedad de Estudios y Publicaciones, Madrid, 1955Filosofía actual y existencialismo en España, Revista de Occidente, Madrid, 1955El oficio del pensamiento, Biblioteca Nueva, Madrid, 1958La Escuela de Madrid. Estudios de filosofía española, Emecé, Buenos Aires, 1959Ortega. I. Circunstancia y vocación, Revista de Occidente, Madrid, 1960Los españoles, Revista de Occidente, Madrid. 1962La España posible en tiempo de Carlos III, Sociedad de Estudios y Publicaciones, Madrid, 1963El tiempo que ni vuelve ni tropieza, Edhasa, Barcelona, 1964Análisis de los Estados Unidos, Guadarrama, Madrid, 1968Antropología metafísica. La estructura empírica de la vida humana, Revista de Occidente, Madrid, 1970Visto y no visto. Crónicas de cine, Guadarrama, Madrid, 1970, 2 vols.Imagen de la India e Israel: una resurrección, Revista de Occidente, Madrid, 1973Problemas del cristianismo, BAC, Madrid, 1979La mujer en el siglo XX, Alianza, Madrid, 1980Ortega. II. Las trayectorias, Alianza, Madrid, 1983España inteligible. Razón histórica de las Españas, Alianza, Madrid, 1985La mujer y su sombra, Alianza, Madrid, 1986Ser español, Planeta, Barcelona, 1987Una vida presente. Memorias, Alianza, Madrid, 1988–1989, 3 vols.: I (1914–1951), II (1951–1975), III (1975–1989).La felicidad humana, Alianza, Madrid 1989Generaciones y constelaciones, Alianza, Madrid, 1989Cervantes, clave española, Alianza, Madrid, 1990Acerca de Ortega, Espasa Calpe, Madrid, 1991La educación sentimental, Alianza, Madrid, 1992Razón de la filosofía, Alianza, Madrid, 1993Mapa del mundo personal, Alianza, Madrid 1993El cine de Julián Marías. Escritos sobre cine, compilation edited by Fernando Alonso, Royal Books, Barcelona, 1994, 2 vols.Tratado de lo mejor, Alianza, Madrid, 1995Persona, Alianza, Madrid, 1996Sobre el cristianismo, Planeta Testimonio, Barcelona, 1997El curso del tiempo, Tomos I y II, Alianza, 1998. 2 vols.Tratado sobre la convivencia, Martínez Roca, Barcelona 2000Entre dos siglos, Alianza, Madrid, 2002Obras, Revista de Occidente / Alianza Editorial, Madrid 1958–1970, 10 vols.

 Selected works in translation History of Philosophy, translated from Spanish by Stanley Appelbaum and Clarence C. Strowbridge, Dover Publications Inc., New York, 1967.Philosophy as Dramatic TheoryMetaphysical Anthropology: The Empirical Structure of Human LifeAmerica in the Fifties and Sixties: Julián Marías on the United StatesBiography of PhilosophyThe Christian Perspective''

References

External links 
HardTalk Extra: Javier Marías, interview in which Javier Marías discusses his father.
Introducción a La Rebelión de la masas

1914 births
2005 deaths
People from Valladolid
20th-century Spanish philosophers
Harvard University faculty
Spanish philosophers
Spanish male writers
Spanish Roman Catholics
Members of the Royal Spanish Academy
University of California, Los Angeles faculty
Wellesley College faculty
Yale University faculty
Complutense University of Madrid alumni
Spanish expatriates in the United States